Augusto e Kafelango Comercial FC best known as AKC is an Angolan sports club from the city of Ondjiva, Cunene province.

In 2017 and 2019, the team qualified to the Gira Angola, the qualifying tournament for Angola's top division, the Girabola.

League & Cup Positions

Managers
 Petronilo de Ortega (2019)

Players

References

Football clubs in Angola
Sports clubs in Angola